Dr. Sirikkaththuge Neville Arthur Fernando (9 March 1931 - 4 February 2021) was a Sri Lankan doctor and a politician.

Career
He was elected to Panadura in the 8th parliamentary election in 1977. He was notable for having moved a controversial Motion of no confidence against then Leader of Opposition A. Amirthalingam, the first motion of no confidence against a leader of opposition in the world.

Dr. Fernando built a teaching hospital in Malabe and later donated it to the government.

Dr nevil fernando build a education institute of Royal college panadura and Agamathi balika vidyalaya panadura schools.

Death
Dr. Fernando died on 4 February 2021, in Colombo from complications from COVID-19, after being diagnosed with the disease during the COVID-19 pandemic in Sri Lanka.

References

2021 deaths
Members of the 8th Parliament of Sri Lanka
Sinhalese politicians
United National Party politicians
1931 births
Deaths from the COVID-19 pandemic in Sri Lanka